This article lists the oldest buildings in the United States and its territories. The list includes sites in current states and territories which were not part of the original Thirteen Colonies when the United States of America was founded in 1776.

Pre-Columbian era

16th century

17th century

18th century

19th century

See also
 List of the oldest buildings in Alabama
 List of the oldest buildings in Alaska
 List of the oldest buildings in Arizona
 List of the oldest buildings in Arkansas
 List of the oldest buildings in California
 List of the oldest buildings in Colorado
 List of the oldest buildings in Connecticut
 List of the oldest buildings in Delaware
 List of the oldest buildings in Florida
 List of the oldest buildings in Georgia
 List of the oldest buildings in Hawaii
 List of the oldest buildings in Idaho
 List of the oldest buildings in Indiana
 List of the oldest buildings in Illinois
 List of the oldest buildings in Iowa
 List of the oldest buildings in Kansas
 List of the oldest buildings in Kentucky
 List of the oldest buildings in Louisiana
 List of the oldest buildings in Maine
 List of the oldest buildings in Maryland
 List of the oldest buildings in Massachusetts
 List of the oldest buildings in Michigan
 List of the oldest buildings in Minnesota
 List of the oldest buildings in Mississippi
 List of the oldest buildings in Missouri
 List of the oldest buildings in Montana
 List of the oldest buildings in Nebraska
 List of the oldest buildings in Nevada
 List of the oldest buildings in New Hampshire
 List of the oldest buildings in New Jersey
 List of the oldest buildings in New Mexico
 List of the oldest buildings in New York
 List of the oldest buildings in North Carolina
 List of the oldest buildings in North Dakota
 List of the oldest buildings in Ohio
 List of the oldest buildings in Oklahoma
 List of the oldest buildings in Oregon
 List of the oldest buildings in Pennsylvania
 List of the oldest buildings in Puerto Rico
 List of the oldest buildings in Rhode Island
 List of the oldest buildings in South Carolina
 List of the oldest buildings in South Dakota
 List of the oldest buildings in Tennessee
 List of the oldest buildings in Texas
 List of the oldest buildings in Utah
 List of the oldest buildings in Vermont
 List of the oldest buildings in Virginia
 List of the oldest buildings in Washington, D.C.
 List of the oldest buildings in Washington (state)
 List of the oldest buildings in West Virginia
 List of the oldest buildings in Wisconsin
 List of the oldest buildings in Wyoming
 List of the oldest buildings in the world
 List of burial mounds in the United States
 List of the oldest churches in the United States
 List of the oldest synagogues in the United States
 List of oldest buildings in the Americas

References

External links
 International Architecture database

Oldest buildings
Oldest buildings
Historic preservation in the United States